Madhuca kuchingensis is a tree in the family Sapotaceae. It is named for the city of Kuching in Borneo.

Description
The bark is greyish brown. Inflorescences bear up to eight flowers.

Distribution and habitat
Madhuca kuchingensis is endemic to Borneo. Its habitat is lowland mixed dipterocarp and kerangas forests from  altitude.

Conservation
Madhuca kuchingensis has been assessed as vulnerable on the IUCN Red List. The species is threatened by logging and conversion of land to palm oil plantations.

References

kuchingensis
Endemic flora of Borneo
Trees of Borneo
Plants described in 2001